Mark Rendall (born October 21, 1988) is a Canadian film, television and voice actor whose roles include the lead in the 2004 film, Childstar and  Mick in season 1 of the Canadian television drama series ReGenesis. He played Bastian Bux in the TV series, Tales from the Neverending Story, and the title character in The Interrogation of Michael Crowe. He has also done voice work for the television series Jane and the Dragon and Time Warp Trio, and starred in the popular PBS Kids TV series Arthur (seasons 7–8; season 6 redub). Recently, Rendall has appeared in several Hollywood films.

Early life
Rendall was born in Toronto, Ontario, the son of Cathy and Henry Rendall. He has two older brothers, David (an actor) and Matthew. His father is Jewish and his mother is Christian and he celebrates both Jewish and Christian holidays.

Career
Rendall started acting at the age of ten, when he asked his parents if he could try his hand at acting. Fortunately, around the same time, the Cameron Maclntosh London touring production of the musical "Oliver" was holding auditions for children. Having had no formal training in either acting or singing, he surprised everyone when he was cast in the role of Spider, and as understudy to the lead role, Oliver.

He later starred in several films, including The Impossible Elephant, Tales from the Neverending Story (for which he received a 2002 Gemini nomination), the multi-award-winning Touching Wild Horses (2002) opposite Jane Seymour (for which he received a 2003 Young Artists Award nomination), Disney's The Scream Team with Eric Idle, the Court TV Peabody Award-winning true story, The Interrogation of Michael Crowe (for which he received a 2004 ACTRA Award nomination for Outstanding Performance - Male), Don McKellar's dark comedy Childstar (2004), opposite Jennifer Jason Leigh, Eric Stoltz and Dave Foley; the title role in Spirit Bear: The Simon Jackson Story (2004) with Ed Begley, Jr. and Graham Greene, NBC's mini-series Revelations (2005) opposite Bill Pullman and Natascha MacElhone, and Francois Girard's Silk. In 2013, he played the lead role in the Canadian film Algonquin, shown at Montreal Film Festival.

Rendall played supporting roles in the films 30 Days of Night, opposite Josh Hartnett and Melissa George, and Charlie Bartlett, with Anton Yelchin and Kat Dennings. In 2009, he starred in the films, Victoria Day, directed by David Bezmozgis and The Exploding Girl, directed by Bradley Rust Gray.

Voice acting
After Justin Bradley ended voicing Arthur, Rendall took his place for seasons 7 and 8. He also dubbed over Bradley's voice for reruns of season 6 due to Bradley's voice being too deep and lacking the vocal range of Michael Yarmush, who was the character's previous voice actor.

In 2003, he voiced Noodle in the children's show The Save-Ums!.

In 2005, he voiced the 14-year-old Jester character of the New Zealand CGI animated show Jane and the Dragon. He has also provided voices for other animated shows, for example King, Time Warp Trio, and Wayside.

Music

In August, 2021, Rendall joined forces with Elliot Page to release three home recorded, low-fidelity tracks and giving them away on Bandcamp.

Filmography

References

External links

1988 births
Canadian male child actors
Canadian male film actors
Canadian male voice actors
Canadian male television actors
Jewish Canadian male actors
Living people
Male actors from Toronto
21st-century Canadian male actors